Jonathan Williams (March 8, 1929 – March 16, 2008) was an American poet, publisher, essayist, and photographer. He is known as the founder of The Jargon Society, which has published poetry, experimental fiction, photography, and folk art since 1951.

Overview
Williams was born in Asheville, North Carolina, to Thomas Benjamin and Georgette Williams, and raised in Washington, D.C. He attended St. Albans School in Washington, and then Princeton University, before dropping out to pursue the arts. Williams studied painting with Karl Knaths at the Phillips Gallery in Washington, D.C., and engraving and graphic arts with Stanley William Hayter at Atelier 17 in New York, followed by a semester at the Chicago Institute of Design. In 1951, he arrived at Black Mountain College to study photography with Harry Callahan and Aaron Siskind. At Black Mountain College, Williams met and was influenced by the College's rector, Charles Olson.

Also in 1951,  Williams founded Jargon Books (later The Jargon Society) together with David Ruff, with the goal of publishing obscure writers. Based in Scaly Mountain, North Carolina, as well as the Yorkshire Dales in England, Jargon was long associated with the Black Mountain Poets. The press has published work by Charles Olson, Paul Metcalf, Lorine Niedecker, Lou Harrison, Mina Loy, Joel Oppenheimer, Ronald Johnson, James Broughton, Alfred Starr Hamilton and many other works by the American and British avant-garde. Since Williams' death, The Jargon Society has continued publication through the Black Mountain College Museum + Arts Center.

Once described as "a busy gadfly who happened somehow to pitch on a slope in western North Carolina," Williams was a living link between the experimental poets of Modernism's "second wave" and the unknown vernacular artists of Appalachia.  Guy Davenport likened Williams' use of "found language" to the use of "found footage" by avant-garde filmmakers, as well as describing Williams as a species of cultural anthropologist.  Williams for his part explained the fascination of such material in plainer terms:

The literary critic Hugh Kenner described Williams as the "truffle hound of American poetry."

Williams was also a longtime contributing editor of the photography journal Aperture.

Williams divided his time between England and Scaly Mountain, North Carolina. He died March 16, 2008, in Highlands, North Carolina, from pneumonia. He was survived by his longtime partner, Thomas Meyer.

Selected bibliography

An Ear in Bartram's Tree: Selected Poems 1957-1967 (Chapel Hill, University of North Carolina Press, 1969; New Directions, 1972).
Mahler (Grossman/Cape Goliard Press, 1969).
The Loco Logodaedalist in Situ: Selected Poems 1968-70 (Cape Goliard Press, 1971).
Elite/Elate Poems: Selected Poems 1971-75 (Jargon Society, 1979).The Magpie's Bagpipe: Selected Essays (North Point Press, 1982).Blues & Roots/Rue & Bluets: A Garland for the Southern Appalachians, revised edition (Duke University Press, 1985).Jubilant Thicket: New and Selected Poems'' (Copper Canyon Press, 2005)

References

External links

Jonathan Williams Tribute Page at the Electronic Poetry Center
Tales of a Jargonaut an interview with Jonathan Williams by Jeffery Beam
The Jargon Society links include current updates and musings from Williams
Biography Page @ncwriters.org  w/bibliography
Tales of a Jargonaut the only slightly edited full Rain Taxi interview with Jonathan Williams by Jeffery Beam
A Snowflake Orchard a personal history of Jargon by poet Jeffery Beam which appeared originally in the North Carolina Literary Review w/bibliography
The Passing of a Poet: Jonathan Williams, 79, Avant-garde Poet, Publisher, and Photographer 
The Lord of Orchards: Jonathan Williams at 80, edited by Jeffery Beam and Richard Owens. An appreciative survey of Williams' life and work including some never before published photos by Williams, and many new and recovered essays about his life and work as a poet, photographer, critic, art collector, and publisher.
A life in pictures: Jonathan Williams A series of photographs documenting Jonathan Williams' life
Jonathan Williams Photographs. Yale Collection of American Literature, Beinecke Rare Book and Manuscript Library.

1929 births
2008 deaths
American male poets
American LGBT poets
Black Mountain College alumni
Black Mountain poets
American book publishers (people)
20th-century American poets
20th-century American male writers
St. Albans School (Washington, D.C.) alumni
Princeton University alumni
Writers from North Carolina
Writers from Asheville, North Carolina
20th-century LGBT people